Laurenţiu Dumănoiu (23 June 1951 – 21 October 2014) was a Romanian volleyball player. He won bronze medals at the 1971 and 1977 European championships and 1980 Olympics, placing fifth in 1972. At the club level he played for Dinamo București and won with them the CEV Cup in 1979 and seven national titles.

References

1951 births
2014 deaths
Deaths in Romania
Romanian men's volleyball players
Olympic volleyball players of Romania
Volleyball players at the 1972 Summer Olympics
Volleyball players at the 1980 Summer Olympics
Olympic bronze medalists for Romania
Olympic medalists in volleyball
Medalists at the 1980 Summer Olympics
Sportspeople from Râmnicu Vâlcea